Gasponia penicillata is a species of beetle in the family Cerambycidae. It was described by Gahan in 1904. It is known from Malawi, Zambia, Namibia, South Africa, Mozambique, and Zimbabwe.

References

Crossotini
Beetles described in 1904